Parenchymia is a proposed clade encompassing Nemertea and Platyhelminthes. The clade was suggested in a 2019 study showing the clade as a sister to Annelida, with both groups together being sister to Lophophorata. The synapomorphies include similar organization of ciliary bands in the larva of both groups, as well as a lack of chitin, and is named for the abundant parenchyma found between the body wall and internal organs of both. A similar taxon, with Mollusca being likewise linked together with Symbion and Entoprocta, has been proposed in a clade called Tetraneuralia.

Phylogeny

References 

Protostome taxonomy
Lophotrochozoa